NGC 2291 is an unbarred lenticular galaxy in the constellation Gemini. It was discovered by John Herschel on January 22, 1827. The visual magnitude is 13, and the apparent size is 1.0 by 0.8 arc minutes.

References

External links 

Gemini (constellation)
Unbarred lenticular galaxies
2291
019719